Gonçalo Óscar Albuquerque Borges (born 29 March 2001) is a Portuguese professional footballer who plays for Primeira Liga club FC Porto as a winger.

Club career
Borges made his LigaPro debut for FC Porto B on 11 August 2019 in a game against Sporting Covilhã.

On 15 December 2021, he made his debut for the A-team, in a League Cup 1-0 victory over Rio Ave. His maiden Primeira Liga appearance took place a month later, on 16 January 2022, where he played the last 8 minutes of a 4-1 away win at Belenenses SAD. This appearance was enough for him to lay claim to a championship winners medal, as the Dragons went on to win the competition.

Honours
Porto Youth
UEFA Youth League: 2018–19

Porto
Primeira Liga: 2021–22
Supertaça Cândido de Oliveira: 2022

References

External links
Profile at the FC Porto website

2001 births
Living people
Footballers from Lisbon
Portuguese footballers
Portugal youth international footballers
Association football forwards
Liga Portugal 2 players
Primeira Liga players
FC Porto B players
FC Porto players